Louis Spencer Epes (January 12, 1882 – February 14, 1935) was an American lawyer, judge and politician. He served as a member of the Senate of Virginia and was appointed as a justice of the Supreme Court of Virginia.

Early life and education
Epes was born in Prince William County, Virginia. He was educated in public schools in Nottoway and at Hoge Military Academy in Blackstone before he entered Hampden-Sydney College in 1898. After graduating in 1901, he taught at Homer Military Academy in Oxford, North Carolina (1901-1903); West Kentucky College, Mayfield, Kentucky (1903-1904), and conducted a private collegiate preparatory school in Helena, Arkansas (1904-1906). In 1906, he entered Washington and Lee University’s Law School, was admitted to the bar in 1907 and received his law degree in 1908. During 1907-1908, he practiced law in Lexington while completing his law course.

Career
In 1908, he entered the firm of Epes and Epes at Blackstone and he practiced there until being appointed to the Virginia State Corporation Commission in November 1925. From 1911 to 1918, he was Mayor of Blackstone, resigning in 1918 to enter the United States Army, from which he was honorably discharged on December 5, 1918. In 1919, he was elected to the Virginia State Senate from Nottoway, Lunenburg, Prince Edward, Cumberland and Amelia Counties and served two terms. Epes served on the State Corporation Commission from November 1925 to November 1929, when the governor appointed him to the Supreme Court of Appeals of Virginia. He remained on the bench until his death.

Sources
 Virginia State Bar Association Proceedings (1936), 171-175.

External links
 
 

Justices of the Supreme Court of Virginia
Virginia lawyers
1882 births
1935 deaths
Hampden–Sydney College alumni
People from Prince William County, Virginia
People from Nottoway County, Virginia
Mayors of places in Virginia
20th-century American judges
20th-century American lawyers